Tuuli Tasa (born 12 November 2002) is an Estonian footballer who plays as a defender for Tammeka and the Estonia women's national team.

Career
She made her debut for the Estonia national team on 18 June 2019 against Belarus, coming on as a substitute for Katrin Loo.

References

2002 births
Living people
Women's association football defenders
Estonian women's footballers
Estonia women's international footballers
Tartu JK Tammeka (women) players
Sportspeople from Tartu